Elias is a given name and surname, the Greek and Latin form of Elijah.

Elias may also refer to:

People

Elias (footballer, born 1931), full name Elias Soares de Oliveira, Brazilian football striker
Elias (footballer, born 1963), full name Fernando Elias Oliveira da Silva, Portuguese former football midfielder
Elias (singer) (born 1980), French singer-songwriter
Elias (footballer, born 1985), full name Elias Mendes Trindade, Brazilian football midfielder
Elias (wrestler) (born 1988), American professional wrestler

Music
Elias, the original German name of Elijah (oratorio), composed by Felix Mendelssohn
Elias (band), a Swedish music band
"Elias", a song by Dispatch referring to Elias Sithole of Zimbabwe, a friend of Chad Urmston

Other uses
Elías, Huila, Colombia, a town
Elias (film), a 1991 Dutch film
Elias Fund, American nonprofit organization that helps children in Zimbabwe
Elias Sports Bureau, American company that provides sports statistics and research
Elias: The Little Rescue Boat, a Norwegian children's book and animated TV series
Elias MRT station a future MRT Station in Singapore as part of the Cross Island MRT Line's branch service to Punggol MRT/ LRT Station.

See also
Elias coding (disambiguation), a series of lossless coding schemes used in digital communications
Elijah (disambiguation)